Viticus is an Argentine hard rock band originally of Tigre, Buenos Aires, formed at the beginning of the decade of the 2000s and influenced mainly by Pappo.

Members 
 Vitico: bass guitar and voice
 Jerónimo Sica: Drums
 Gaston Videla: Guitar
 Sebastián Bereciartúa: Guitar and vocals

Former members
 Ariel Rodríguez: Guitar and vocals
 Francisco Isola: Drums
 Nicolás Urionagüena: Drums

Discography 
 Viticus (2003)
 Super (2006)
 Viticus III (2008)
 Rock local (2011)

External links 
 Official website

Argentine rock music groups